"Should've Gone Home" is a song by Swedish singer Måns Zelmerlöw. It was released on 7 August 2015 as the second single from Zelmerlöw's sixth studio album, Perfectly Damaged (2015), following the Eurovision Song Contest 2015 winning song "Heroes". The song was written by Fredrik Sonefors, Martin Bjelke, and Micky Skeel. The song has peaked at number 27 on the Swedish Singles Chart.

Zelmerlöw also released a bilingual English/French version titled "Should've Gone Home (Je ne suis qu'un homme)" aimed at French-speaking markets. That single charted on SNEP, the official French Singles Chart.

Live performances
Zelmerlöw performed the song from the roof of a building next to the Liseberg crowd at the Lotta på Liseberg, creating both a feeling of "isolation" and intimacy.

Music video
The music video, which was directed by Mikeadelica, was released on 16 September 2015 after being "unlocked" by the fans via streaming of the song online platforms. It features a backwards story of Zelmerlöw going to tell his girlfriend about his cheating.

Track listing

Chart performance

Weekly charts
"Should've Gone Home"

"Should've Gone Home (Je ne suis qu'un homme)"

Certifications

Release history

References

2015 songs
2015 singles
Måns Zelmerlöw songs
English-language Swedish songs